The 15th Pan American Games were held in Rio de Janeiro, Brazil from 13 July 2007 to 29 July 2007.

Medals

Bronze

Men's – 62 kg: David Mendoza

External links
Rio 2007 Official website

Nations at the 2007 Pan American Games
P
2007